Vat Green 1 is an organic compound that is used as a vat dye. It is a derivative of benzanthrone. It is a dark green solid. Vat Green 1 can dye viscose, silk, wool, paper, and soap.

References 

Violanthrone dyes
Vat dyes
Phenol ethers